Operation Density  (or "Operation Specific Weight"), also known as "The Fajr Night", was a Military operation conducted by the Israeli Air Force on the second day of the 2006 Lebanon War. In the operation, official Israeli military sources claim that the majority of Hizbullahs’ long-range rockets were destroyed in air strikes that lasted 34 minutes. Other sources question that the attack had any apparent effect on Hizbullah capabilities.

Background
The 2006 Lebanon War began when Hezbollah captured two Israeli soldiers. As result of this, a forum gathered in the Israeli army HQ in Tel Aviv, about the possible responses to the attack. One suggestion was the launch of "Operation Density", an air strike with the purpose of destroying the long range rocket capability of Hezbollah. After long discussion, the Israeli cabinet approved the operation.

The operation

In the early hours of July 13, a series of Israeli airstrikes targeted dozens of stationary missile launchers concealed in the homes of Hezbollah activists and Shiite families throughout Lebanon. The IDF claimed to have hit 59 missile launchers. A large number of Hezbollah's Iranian-made long-range rockets were claimed to have been destroyed, with estimates ranging from one-half to two-thirds.

"All the long-range rockets have been destroyed," Chief of Staff Halutz allegedly told the Israeli government on the second day of the war, "we've won the war."

Some sources agree that the operation was a success. According to Israeli journalists Amos Harel and Avi Issacharoff the operation was Israel's most impressive military achievement during the war, and a "devastating blow for Hezbollah". Harel and Issacharoff claimed that the operation was a success due to painstaking work carried out by Israeli intelligence. It also took Hizbullah completely by surprise, as it had believed that the location of its long-range missiles was a safely guarded secret. 

US military analyst William Arkin acknowledged that two experienced American observers noted that the Israeli Air Force had devastated Hizbullah's missile stocks in 39 minutes, but wrote that there was "little evidence" that the Israeli Air Force even attempted, much less succeeded in, wiping out the medium and long range rocket capability in the first days of the war. While he acknowledged that some sort of preplanned Israeli attack took place, he dismissed the claim as an "absurdity" and a "tale". Another US analyst, Benjamin Lambeth, however, insisted that it was far-fetched to suggest that the "authoritative Israeli leadership pronouncements" were not based on facts. He admitted however that there was "persistent uncertainty" surrounding the "few known facts and figures" concerning the attacks. Anthony Cordesman believed that IAF probably destroyed most long and medium range missiles in the first two days of the war but acknowledged that these claims "have never been validated or described in detail."

Hizbullah long remained silent on this episode of the war. On the sixth anniversary of the Lebanon war Hizbullah chairman Hassan Nasrallah claimed that Hizbullah had known that the Israelis were collecting information on the rocket platforms and launchers and managed to move them without being detected. Most of the locations attacked by the Israeli air force were therefore empty.

References

Sources

Cambanis, Thanassis, A Privilege to Die: Inside Hezbollah's Legions and Their Endless War Against Israel, Free Press, New York, 2010

Lilach Gonen (July 13, 2012), Opening Strike
Dudi (David) Yaron (August 3, 2014), Israel’s Air Force: From the Second Lebanon War to Protective Edge

2006 Lebanon War
Aerial operations and battles involving Israel
July 2006 events in Asia